Penyrheol is the name of an electoral ward and a suburb in the City and County of Swansea, Wales, UK.

The electoral ward consists of some or all of the following areas: Penyrheol, Grovesend and Waun Gron, in the parliamentary constituency of Gower.  It is bordered by the Loughor estuary to the north west; and the wards of Pontarddulais to the north; Llangyfelach to the east; and Upper Loughor, Kingsbridge, Gorseinon and Penllergaer to the south.

For the 2008 local council elections, the turnout was 34.16%.  The results were:

In 2012 the result was as follows:

Swansea electoral wards